The London and North Western Railway (LNWR) DX Goods class was a class of 0-6-0 steam locomotive, designed by John Ramsbottom for freight duties. 943 were constructed, making them the largest single class of steam locomotives built in the United Kingdom. Despite this, none were preserved.

History

The "DX" goods engine was the first original design produced by Ramsbottom, shortly after becoming Locomotive Superintendent of the Northern Division. An experimental prototype was developed at Longsight whilst Ramsbottom was only in charge of the North-Eastern Division. The first regular example was completed at Crewe Works in September 1858, and was given the running number 355. This was the 399th locomotive built at Crewe, but it was the practice of the LNWR to reuse the numbers of withdrawn locomotives.

The first DX, No. 355, was named Hardman, and carried the name on a curved brass plate above the driving wheels. It was painted in the same dark green livery as used by Ramsbottom's predecessor, Francis Trevithick, but edged with a single black line. Fifty-four of the early DX locomotives were given names, but all were removed by 1864, with some re-used on passenger locomotives.

Four 0-4-2 versions of this locomotive type were built by Robert Stephenson and supplied to the Sydney Railway Company in 1855 as the first motive power for the new railway company. They were virtually identical in specification, except for slightly larger  driving wheels and smaller  diameter cylinders.

857 examples of Ramsbottom’s standard goods design were built for the LNWR at Crewe Works between 1858 and 1872. The class has been described as  ‘the earliest example of standardization and mass productions of locomotives on a large scale,' and ‘a remarkable instance of standardisation at a time when most railways had many different classes, each class with only few engines.’. During the 1870s driving cabs were added. 
278 examples of a saddle tank version of the design were built after 1870, known as the LNWR Special Tank.

In addition to the 857 examples used by the LNWR, a further 86 examples of the original design were constructed at Crewe for the Lancashire and Yorkshire Railway (LYR) between 1871 and 1874. This alarmed independent locomotive manufacturers, who sought an injunction to stop the practice; it was granted on 16 December 1875.

The 943 locomotives were all built at Crewe as follows:

Crewe numbers 1428–33 (total 6), delivered new to the LNWR in October 1871, were sold to the LYR in November 1871. Crewe numbers 1489–98, 1532–41, 1602–21 and 1722–61 (total 80) were delivered new to the LYR. Most of those built from 1872 onwards (total 130) incorporated modifications by Francis Webb such as being fitted with cabs.

From April 1881, Webb rebuilt 500 examples with a new 150 psi boiler and vacuum brakes for working passenger trains. These became known as ‘Special’ (or vacuum) DX’s.

Accidents and incidents
On 12 January 1899, locomotive 1418 was hauling a freight train that was derailed at Penmaenmawr, Caernarfonshire due to the trackbed being washed away in a storm. Both locomotive crew were killed.

Withdrawals
Withdrawals began in 1902, but there were still 88 engines in existence at the time of the London, Midland and Scottish Railway's formation in 1923. The last survivor was withdrawn in 1930. Despite the large number of the class produced, all were scrapped.

Engines converted to other uses
The chassis of a withdrawn DX Goods locomotive was repurposed as a stationary engine on the Sheep Pasture Incline of the Cromford and High Peak Railway in February 1884 but was replaced by an electric winch in 1964.

Engines sold abroad
Between 1900 and 1901, four LNWR Special DX were sold to the Société Anonyme du Chemin de Fer International de Malines à Terneuzen, a private railway between Belgium and the Netherlands. They were renumbered 15, 16, 17 and 18. Three of them were rebuilt between 1910 and 1911 with larger cabs of Belgian design and all of them were fitted with Westinghouse brakes sometimes after 1911. One of them (number 15) was still on the active roster in 1948 when the Malines - Terneuzen was taken over by SNCB. All the M.T. engines were then scrapped.

References 

DX Goods
0-6-0 locomotives
Railway locomotives introduced in 1858
Scrapped locomotives
Standard gauge steam locomotives of Great Britain
Freight locomotives